Anderson Soares da Silva, best known as Mazinho (born October 16, 1987 in Barbosa Ferraz) is a Brazilian footballer who plays as a winger.

Club career
In 2012, Mazinho signed a loan with Palmeiras. He won the 2012 Copa do Brasil with Palmeiras, and scored twice in the semi-final against Grêmio.

On 28 January 2013, Mazinho signed a loan with Vissel Kobe.

Mazinho joined Oeste, where he became the leading goal-scorer of the 2016 Campeonato Brasileiro Série B.

Honours
Oeste
 Campeonato Paulista do Interior de Futebol: 2011

Palmeiras
 Copa do Brasil: 2012

See also
 List of Sociedade Esportiva Palmeiras players

External links
 Palmeiras.com.br profile

References

1987 births
Living people
Sportspeople from Paraná (state)
Brazilian footballers
Brazilian expatriate footballers
Oeste Futebol Clube players
Sociedade Esportiva Palmeiras players
Vissel Kobe players
Coritiba Foot Ball Club players
Campeonato Brasileiro Série A players
J2 League players
Expatriate footballers in Japan
Brazilian expatriate sportspeople in Japan
Association football forwards